It's America is the third studio album by American country music singer Rodney Atkins. It was released on March 31, 2009 by Curb Records. The album's first single, its title track, was released on November 24, 2008 and became Atkins' fifth number one hit on the U.S. Billboard Hot Country Songs chart. It was followed by "15 Minutes" (a Top 20 hit) and "Chasin' Girls." The album was re-issued in mid-2010 to include a new single, "Farmer's Daughter."

The album debuted at No. 15 on Billboard'''s album chart selling 34,877 copies.

As of August 2010, the album has sold 129,820 copies in the US.

Track listing

Personnel
Rodney Atkins – lead vocals
Liam Bailey – background vocals
Tim Buppert – background vocals
Larry Franklin – fiddle
Ted Hewitt – 12-string guitar, acoustic guitar, electric guitar, background vocals
Angela Hurt – background vocals
Mike Johnson – Dobro, steel guitar, lap steel guitar
Troy Lancaster – electric guitar
Gordon Mote – keyboards
Larry Paxton – bass guitar
Gary Prim – keyboards
Kevin Rapillo – percussion
Duane Sciacqua – electric guitar
Steve Sheehan – acoustic guitar
J.D. Simo – electric guitar
Bryan Sutton – banjo, acoustic guitar
Lonnie Wilson – drums
Jonathan Yudkin – fiddle

Singles
The album's first single release was its title track, written by Brett James and Angelo Petraglia. Released in late 2008, the song went on to become the fifth Number One single of his career. It was followed by "15 Minutes" at number 20, and "Chasin' Girls", which failed to make the Top 40. The latter was partially re-written for its radio edit. The song debuted in September 2009 but failed to reach the country Top 40, peaking at No. 48.

In March 2010, the album was re-released with "Farmer's Daughter" added to the track list, and the radio edit of "Chasin' Girls" in place of the original recording. "Farmer's Daughter" has reached Top 20 on Hot Country Songs.

Critical reception

Todd Sterling of Allmusic rated the album three stars out of five, saying that Atkins "plays it safe and sticks to the same formula used on If You're Going Through Hell''." Also giving it three stars, Roughstock critic Liz Jungers thought that the album was "feel-good through and through" and that it had "killer musicianship," but criticized it for lacking musical variety. Pierce Greenberg of Engine 145 also criticized the album for having too many "frothy feel-good, I-am-blessed" songs, saying that it such songs "would benefit from being on a more diverse album." He rated the album two stars out of five. In his Consumer Guide, Robert Christgau gave the album a "dud" rating, calling it "a bad record whose details rarely merit further thought."

Chart performance

Weekly charts

Year-end charts

Singles

References

2009 albums
Rodney Atkins albums
Curb Records albums